Gobuntu was a short-lived official derivative of the Ubuntu operating system that was conceived to provide a distribution consisting entirely of free software. It was first released in October 2007.

Because Ubuntu now incorporates a "free software only" installer option, the Gobuntu project was rendered redundant in early 2008. As a result, Canonical made the decision officially to end the Gobuntu project with version 8.04.

In March 2009, it was announced that "Gobuntu 8.04.1 is the final release of Gobuntu. The project has merged back to mainline Ubuntu, so there is no need for a separate distribution".

History and development
Mark Shuttleworth first mentioned the idea of creating an Ubuntu derivative named Gnubuntu consisting entirely of free software, on 24 November 2005. Due to Richard Stallman's disapproval of the name, the project was later renamed Ubuntu-libre.  Stallman had previously endorsed a distribution based on Ubuntu called gNewSense, and has criticized Ubuntu for using proprietary and non-free software in successive distributions, most notably, Ubuntu 7.04.

While introducing Ubuntu 7.10, Mark Shuttleworth said that it would 

Gobuntu was officially announced by Mark Shuttleworth on 10 July 2007 and daily builds of Gobuntu 7.10 began to be publicly released. The initial version, Gobuntu 7.10, was released on 18 October 2007, as an in text-only installer. The next release was the Long-Term Release codenamed "Hardy Heron", which was also only made available as an alternate installation image.

Release 7.10 initially met with criticism from some free software advocates because it included Mozilla Firefox. Firefox is not considered to be 100% free software because it includes Mozilla Foundation copyrighted icons. The Mozilla licence for the icons states that they "...may not be reproduced without permission". After some debate on the developer list, this problem was quickly addressed by Canonical, and the applications with non-free logos were replaced in the follow-up Gobuntu release, Hardy Heron. Firefox was replaced by Epiphany, which has free logos.

Because some drivers, firmware, and "binary blobs" were removed from Gobuntu, it would run on fewer computers than Ubuntu. Canonical stated at the time of release of 7.10:

On 13 June 2008 Ubuntu Community Manager Jono Bacon announced that the Gobuntu project would end with the release of Gobuntu 8.04:

Shuttleworth explained:

The project ended with the release of version 8.04.1.

Releases
Gobuntu versions were intended to be released twice a year, coinciding with Ubuntu releases. Gobuntu uses the same version numbers and code names as Ubuntu, using the year and month of the release as the version number. The first Gobuntu release, for example, was 7.10, indicating October 2007.

Gobuntu releases are also given code names, using an adjective and an animal with the same first letter e.g.: "Gutsy Gibbon". These are the same as the respective Ubuntu code names. Commonly, Gobuntu releases are referred to by developers and users by only the adjective portion of the code name, for example Gutsy Gibbon is often called just Gutsy.

References

External links
Gobuntu page in Ubuntu Wiki

Linux distributions
Discontinued Linux distributions
Ubuntu derivatives
History of free and open-source software
Free software only Linux distributions